Sherry Bryce (born May 28, 1946 in Duncanville, Alabama) is an American country music artist.

Between 1971 and 1977, she charted fifteen times on the Billboard country singles charts, including seven duets with Mel Tillis. 
Their highest-charting duet was 1971's "Take My Hand" at No. 8. They were also nominated in 1974 at the Country Music Association awards for Duo of the Year. 
At the time, both she and Tillis were signed to MGM/Curb Records, and she recorded two duet albums with him. Bryce released six solo singles on the label and two solo albums but none of the singles reached higher than No. 45. 
Bryce also recorded briefly for MCA and Pilot Records in 1976 and 1977, owning the latter label with her husband, Mack Sanders.

Discography

Albums

Singles

Duets with Mel Tillis

References

External links 
 Sherry Bryce - Rate Your Music

20th-century births
Living people
People from Tuscaloosa County, Alabama
American women country singers
Country musicians from Alabama
Curb Records artists
Songwriters from Alabama
Year of birth missing (living people)
21st-century American women